Foursome (promoted as Playboy's Foursome) is an adult reality dating series, which ran for five seasons on Playboy TV.

Premise
Based on similar reality dating game shows of the early 2000s like Blind Date and The 5th Wheel, Foursome gathers four singles, two men and two women, and bases them in a Los Angeles (and, in some later episodes, New York City or Miami) mansion for 24 hours. Throughout the experience daters are introduced, profiled, and made to participate in erotic activities both in the mansion and off-site.

Playmates and models generally instigate the first round sexually-oriented party games, followed by "field trips" to Hollywood clubs, massage parlors, or trendy bars. What transpires between the participants varies depending on factors such as chemistry. In some episodes, they may engage in one or more sexual encounters; in others, they may go to bed separately without doing so; occasionally, a participant may be so dissatisfied that he or she leaves the mansion early. Participants also occasionally "hook up" with the facilitators of the various activities in lieu of or in addition to their fellow residents.

Notable singles from past seasons include Survivor contestant Ozzy Lusth, Big Brother 11 contestants Michele Noonan and Braden Bacha, adult actress Mika Tan, Diana Prince, Scarlett Fay, Kelly Divine, The Real World cast member Dunbar Flinn, Flavor of Love contestant Brooke "Pumkin" Thompson, I Love New York contestants Jason "Heat" Rosell and Sandro "Rico" Padrone.

Season 2 and beyond
In 2008, Foursome returned for a second season, featuring a new mansion and slightly updated format. In some episodes, facilitators and other special guests end up having sex with participants, leading to friction among some daters.

In September 2009, Playboy TV premiered a third season of the series, with cameras going to homes in Las Vegas, San Francisco, and Miami.

In September 2010, Playboy TV announced the fourth season of the series which takes place in New York City, and Los Angeles. A fifth season aired in 2011.

Beginning in the second season, the level of sexual explicitness increased in the series, with penetration and other sexual acts shown uncensored. As noted below, this resulted in the DVD release of Season 2 being edited to remove such content.

DVD releases
As of spring 2010, season 1 has been released to DVD in region 1 over two volumes, with a single-volume Season 2 release. The second season DVD is censored to remove explicit footage from the original broadcasts.

Foursome: Walk of Shame
This spinoff goes back to the original series with guest star comedians giving their insights to the ongoings in the show. This series ran for two seasons from February 2, 2013 until April 19, 2014.

References

External links
 

2000s American game shows
2010s American game shows
2006 American television series debuts
2011 American television series endings
Television series by Playboy Enterprises
Playboy TV original programming